Jackson Township is one of the fourteen townships of Perry County, Ohio, United States.  The 2000 census found 2,791 people in the township, 1,973 of whom lived in the unincorporated portions of the township.

Geography
Located in the western part of the county, it borders the following townships:
Reading Township - north
Clayton Township - northeast corner
Pike Township - east
Salt Lick Township - southeast corner
Monday Creek Township - south
Marion Township, Hocking County - southwest corner
Rush Creek Township, Fairfield County - west

The village of Junction City is located in northern Jackson Township.

Name and history
Jackson Township was organized around 1805, and named for General Andrew Jackson, afterward 7th President of the United States. It is one of thirty-seven Jackson Townships statewide.

Government
The township is governed by a three-member board of trustees, who are elected in November of odd-numbered years to a four-year term beginning on the following January 1. Two are elected in the year after the presidential election and one is elected in the year before it. There is also an elected township fiscal officer, who serves a four-year term beginning on April 1 of the year after the election, which is held in November of the year before the presidential election. Vacancies in the fiscal officership or on the board of trustees are filled by the remaining trustees.

References

External links
County website

Townships in Perry County, Ohio
Townships in Ohio
1805 establishments in Ohio